The Million Dollar Backfield was a National Football League (NFL) offensive backfield of the Chicago Cardinals in 1947 after an unprecedented amount of money by Cardinals owner Charles Bidwill lured several of the day's top players to the team. The Million Dollar backfield was also referred to separately as the Dream Backfield by Bidwill.

Line-up
 Elmer Angsman, HB
 Paul Christman, QB
 Marshall Goldberg, HB
 Pat Harder, FB
 Charley Trippi, HB

History
After World War II, professional football experienced an increase in popularity. The Cardinals hired Jimmy Conzelman as their new head coach. Soon afterwards Conzelman implemented the “T” formation. He then drafted quarterback Paul Christman in 1945 to run the offense. A year later, fullback Pat Harder and halfback Elmer Angsman were added to the line-up.

It was around this time that the upstart All-America Football Conference (AAFC) placed a team in Chicago, the Rockets. The new AAFC franchise publicly pushed for the Cardinals to leave town, since the city had three major football teams. Bidwill grew angry and vowed to turn his team into a profitable winner. He stunned the football world in 1947 when he outbid the Rockets for the rights to All-American, Charley Trippi, signing him to a then unprecedented $100,000 contract. Trippi was the final piece of what Bidwill called his "Million Dollar Backfield" of Paul Christman, Pat Harder, Marshall Goldberg, and Trippi. The quartet led the Cardinals to defeat their cross-town nemesis, the Chicago Bears, in the season finale to win the NFL's Western Division title with 9–3–0 record. The backfield then led the team to their first and only undisputed NFL championship in 1947. Charles Bidwill did not live see his "Million Dollar Backfield" win the 1947 title; he had died of pneumonia shortly after signing Trippi.

See also
 History of the Chicago Cardinals
 Million Dollar Backfield (San Francisco 49ers)

References

Nicknamed groups of American football players
Chicago Cardinals